The Demi-Bride is a 1927 American comedy film directed by Robert Z. Leonard, depicting the naughtiness synonymous with Paris at the time. The film is considered lost. A one minute fragment was shared by the Eye Filmmuseum.

Synopsis
Criquette (Norma Shearer) is Madame Girard (Carmel Myers)'s stepdaughter who blackmailed Philippe (Lew Cody) into marriage.

Cast
 Norma Shearer as Criquette 
 Lew Cody as Philippe Levaux 
 Lionel Belmore as Monsieur Girard 
 Tenen Holtz as Gaston 
 Carmel Myers as Madame Girard 
 Dorothy Sebastian as Lola 
 Nora Cecil as School Teacher

References

External links

Progressive Silent Film List: The Demi-Bride at silentera.com, with still

1927 films
Films directed by Hobart Henley
Lost American films
Metro-Goldwyn-Mayer films
American silent feature films
American black-and-white films
1927 comedy films
Silent American comedy films
Films directed by Robert Z. Leonard
1927 lost films
Lost comedy films
Films with screenplays by Florence Ryerson
Films with screenplays by F. Hugh Herbert
Films set in Paris
1920s American films